The men's team pursuit race of the 2013–14 ISU Speed Skating World Cup 4, arranged in Sportforum Hohenschönhausen, in Berlin, Germany, was held on 7 December 2013.

The Dutch team took their third consecutive victory for the season, while the South Korean team came second, and the Polish team came third.

Results
The race took place on Saturday, 7 December, in the afternoon session, scheduled at 15:30.

References

Men team pursuit
4